Abbotts Barton is a village in Hampshire, England.

In 1887, John Bartholomew's Gazetteer of the British Isles described Abbots Barton as:

Abbots Barton, seat, near Winchester, Hants.

References

External links

Villages in Hampshire